Mariapolis  AKA the Gateway to Nature, is an unincorporated community recognized as a local urban district located within the Municipality of Lorne in south central Manitoba, Canada.  It is located approximately 67 kilometers (42 miles) northwest of Morden.

See also 
List of regions of Manitoba
List of rural municipalities in Manitoba

References 

Local urban districts in Manitoba